The Mad River is a  river in the White Mountains of New Hampshire in the United States. It is a tributary of the Pemigewasset River, part of the Merrimack River watershed.

The Mad River begins at the Greeley Ponds in Mad River Notch, a mountain pass between Mount Osceola to the west and Mount Kancamagus to the east, in the township of Livermore. The river descends to the south, followed by the Greeley Pond Trail, to the town of Waterville Valley, where the West Branch enters.

After winding through the Waterville Valley Resort community, the Mad River proceeds southwest over continuous boulder-strewn rapids into a corner of the town of Thornton, eventually settling out in Campton Pond in the town of Campton. Passing over a small hydroelectric dam at Campton Upper Village, the river descends over some small waterfalls and enters the floodplain of the Pemigewasset River, which it joins near Interstate 93.

For most of the river's length below Waterville Valley, it is paralleled by New Hampshire Route 49.

See also

List of rivers of New Hampshire

References

Tributaries of the Merrimack River
Rivers of New Hampshire
Rivers of Grafton County, New Hampshire